Live in Brasília is the fifth live concert by Mexican Latin pop group RBD. The material was recorded at the Esplanada dos Ministérios in Brasília, Brazil on April 21, 2008, in a front of a crowd of more than 500,000 people, the biggest show of the band's career. The live video album shows the free concert RBD presented during the 48th anniversary of the Brazilian capital, which formed part of the group's Empezar Desde Cero World Tour (2008). The DVD was released in Brazil on March 26, 2009 and in Mexico on June 9, 2009. The CD and streaming were released in Worldwide on October 5, 2020.

Background 

In April 2007, RBD arrived in Brazil to present their second worldwide concert tour, the Tour Celestial. When the group came to Brasília, then president of Brazil, Luiz Inácio Lula da Silva, invited the group to his house, where they shared a barbecue and a friendly game of soccer. After that, the president invited the group to present themselves on the 48th anniversary of the Brazilian capital, which would take place the following year.

Concert synopsis and release 
In the middle of the celebrations of the 48th anniversary of the Brazilian capital, Brasília, on April 21, 2008, RBD presented themselves in a free concert to almost a million people in the Esplanada dos Ministérios. This was the show with the biggest attendance of RBD's Tour Celestial and also the concert with the highest attendance of the band's entire career. The concert's setlist mostly featured songs from the album Empezar Desde Cero and some of the group's biggest hits from their previous albums.

In comparison to RBD's previous live concert DVD releases, this was the one that took the longest to be released. Almost a year after the concert had been held, Brazil was the first country to get the release, on March 26, 2009. Soon after, it was released in the United States and in Mexico on June 9, 2009. On July 14, 2009, the DVD was released in Spain. The actual concert earned the distinction of being one of the 10 largest international shows ever held in Brazil.

Track list

 Intro Desde Cero
 "Fui La Niña"
 "Money Money"
 "Me Voy"
 "Ser O Parecer"
 "Dame"
 Medley: "Tenerte y Quererte" / "Un poco de tu amor" / "Otro Día Que Va" / "Solo Quédate En Silencio"
 "Inalcanzable"
 "I Wanna Be the Rain"
 "Bésame Sin Miedo"
 "Este Corazón"
 "A Tu Lado"
 "Sálvame"
 "Y No Puedo Olvidarte"
 "No Pares"
 "Empezar Desde Cero"
 Medley: "No Digas Nada" / "Si No Estás Aquí" / "El Mundo Detrás" / "Sueles Volver"
 "Extraña Sensación"
 "Celestial"
 "Aún Hay Algo"
 "Tras de Mí"
 "Rebelde"
Bonus material
 Behind the scenes – 12:58

 Notes
The entire show leaked into the Internet in mid March 2009, to mixed reviews from fans. 
Although it was rumored by fans that the songs "Nuestro Amor" and "Cuando El Amor Se Acaba" were cut from the DVD release, these songs were not included on RBD's actual tour setlist.

Personnel 
Credits adapted from the DVD's liner notes.

Recording location
 Esplanada dos Ministérios (Brasília, Brazil)

Mixing locations
LCM Records Studios

Performance credits
RBD – main artist
Güido Laris – choruses
Charly Rey – choruses

Musicians

Güido Laris – acoustic guitar, bass, musical direction
Mauricio Soto "Bicho" – drums
Charly Rey – acoustic guitar, lead guitar

Eddie Tellez – keyboards, piano
Luis Emilio Arreaza "Catire" – percussion

Production

Luis Luisillo Miguel – associate producer
Thiago Pires – audio assistant
Marcos Possato – audio assistant
Juan Orlando Calzada – audio engineer
Arnaldo Ferreira – audio logistics
Gabisom – audio recording
Julio Cezar Lara – authoring 
Jose Gonzales – bodyguard 
Oscar Macias – bodyguard
Paulo Carrera – coordination
Ornela Ferrari – coordination
Carolina Palomo – coordination
William Ricardo – coordination
Jose Roberto Ferreira – crew logistics
Djair Silva – electrotechnician 
Antonio Sobrinho – engineer
Milton Urcioli – executive director
Pedro Damián – executive producer
Sandra Ferraz – executive producer, production director
Raphael Bethlen – DVD direction, making-of director
Leo Ferraz – DVD direction, making-of director
Santiago Ferraz – DVD direction
Jerónimo Ramírez – lighting
Mondo Entretenimiento Rafael Reisman – local promoter
William John Murphy – make-up, wardrobe
Danilo Cardoso – making-of editor
Juan Carlos Rosas – marketing
Adriano Daga – mastering, mixing
Jotaeme – mobile unit team
Gustavo Zertuche – monitor engineer
Güido Laris – musical direction, programming, sequencing
Carlos Alberto Carvhalo – operation supervisor
Reginaldo Dias – operator
Paulo Rogerio – operator
Ricardo Márquez – personal manager
Juan Manuel Puerto "El Oso" – personal manager
Bruno Lima – photography director
Marcelo Ferraz – Pro Tools, recording engineer
Pedro – Pro Tools editing
Bia Tabosa – production director
Dante Gudiño – production manager 
Richard Bull – promoter
Roptus.com – promoter
Ignacio Rodríguez – promoter
Guillermo Rosas – promoter
Roberto Gómez – publicist
Leo Richter – screen design, video editing
Dorival Dellias Filho (Chateau) – TV direction
Lazaro Filho – technical assistant
Carlos Gomes – technical assistant
Arnaldo Itahaji – technical assistant
Amado Jr. – technical assistant
Rodrigo Lisboa – technical assistant
Geraldo Magela – technical assistant
Hilton Menezes – technical assistant
Jose Silva – technical assistant
Jose Augusto Silva Jr. – technical assistant
Tiago Franco Silva – technical assistant
Antonio Rabelo – technical assistant
Alexandre Nobrega Sobrinho – technician
Jason Thibault – tour controller
Katia Peña – tour manager
Christian Rodríguez – video director
LCM Records – video production

Charts

Release history

References

RBD video albums